Major Augustin Schramm (March 2, 1907 in Liberec – May 27, 1948 in Prague) was an ethnic German Czechoslovak communist professional and NKVD agent. He was a member of the Central Committee of the Communist Party of Czechoslovakia (KSČ) in 1930s. During World War II Schramm was a political commissar (rank of major) at a training school for partisan parachuters in the USSR, and after the war he was Head of the Partisans‘ Affair Department at KSČ HQ, and at Czechoslovakian Ministry of Defence too, and co-ordinator of his own intelligence network.

Schramm was often suspected of playing the key role in the assassination of Jan Masaryk, democratic Foreign Minister, after the Communist takeover of Czechoslovakia on February 25, 1948. However, there isn't enough evidence to support this claim. He was shot dead in his own flat two and half months later. The Communist political police and justice prosecuted, sentenced and executed Miloslav Choc, a young anticommunist. However, there are indications that Schramm was a man who knew too much, and his murder was a cover-up ordered by the NKVD and Communist parties' authorities. Late Major A. Schramm was celebrated as a "martyr of Communism" before the Velvet Revolution in 1989.

1907 births
1948 deaths
Politicians from Liberec
Sudeten German people
Communist Party of Czechoslovakia politicians
Czechoslovak murder victims
People murdered in Czechoslovakia
Czechoslovak expatriates in the Soviet Union
People granted political asylum in the Soviet Union
People of the StB